Havmanden-class submarine may refer to:

 , a class of submarines built for the Royal Danish Navy from 1911 to 1914
  or U-20-class submarine, a class of submarines built for the Austro-Hungarian Navy during World War I
 , a ship class of World War II